North Third Street Historic District is a national historic district located at Louisiana, Pike County, Missouri. The district encompasses 61 contributing buildings, one contributing site, and contributing structure in a predominantly residential section of Louisiana. It developed between about 1843 and 1935 and includes representative examples of Greek Revival, Gothic Revival, Italianate, Queen Anne, Colonial Revival, and Bungalow/American Craftsman style architecture. Located in the district are the separately listed Louisiana Public Library and Luce-Dyer House. Other notable buildings include the William C. Hardin House, James H. Johnson House, Edward G. McQuie House, St. Joseph's Catholic Church (1874), and Frank Boehm, Jr. House.

It was listed on the National Register of Historic Places in 2005.

References

Geography of Pike County, Missouri
Historic districts on the National Register of Historic Places in Missouri
Greek Revival architecture in Missouri
Gothic Revival architecture in Missouri
Neoclassical architecture in Missouri
Italianate architecture in Missouri
Queen Anne architecture in Missouri
Colonial Revival architecture in Missouri
Bungalow architecture in Missouri
Buildings and structures in Pike County, Missouri
National Register of Historic Places in Pike County, Missouri